Westonbirt School is a co-educational independent day and boarding school for boys and girls aged 11 to 18 located near Tetbury in Gloucestershire in South West England. Founded in 1928. The historical Westonbirt House is part of the school. Westonbirt Prep School is located within the 210 acre grounds of Westonbirt School.

History
Westonbirt School was founded by the Martyrs' Memorial and Church of England Trust (now known as the Allied Schools), which had acquired Westonbirt House and converted it into a school. During World War II, the premises were used by the Air Ministry and pupils and staff were evacuated to Wiltshire due to the Blitz. Six old girls died during the war and a memorial scholarship was set in their memory; girls who are daughters of British military personnel are entitled special discounts.

In 2002, Westonbirt acquired Querns School to become its preparatory department. Seven years later it absorbed Rose Hill School to form the prep school Rose Hill Westonbirt. In September 2013 Rose Hill Westonbirt School was renamed Westonbirt Prep School.

As of September 2019, Westonbirt became co-educational and welcomed boys into year 7. The school will be welcoming boys in years 7,8,9 and 12 in September 2020.

Houses
Pupils are approximately two-thirds boarders and one-third day girls, all of whom are members of one of the following houses:

Dorchester, named after Dorchester House owned by Robert Holford in London, which served as the American Embassy from 1905 and 1912 and was demolished in 1929 to be replaced by the Dorchester luxury hotel. Dorchester dormitories are located in the old servants' quarters at the top of the house, including the school's central tower, currently part of the Dorchester House Mistress' rooms.

Badminton, named after Badminton House with dormitories located in the west wing of the house on the second floor.

Beaufort, named after Beaufort Polo Club, located near the school. This house is occupied completely by first and second year girls who are then sorted into one of the other two houses when they enter their third year.

The Sixth Form acts as a fourth house.

Holford, named after Robert Stayner Holford, owner of Westonbirt House before it was a school. Holford dormitories occupy the most elaborately decorated part of the house and are located around the balcony overlooking the great hall. This is no longer used to house dorms, and the three houses have been merged to form two.

Buildings and grounds

The majority of the classrooms at the school are located in the courtyard, an area that was stables during the buildings' life as a stately home. Half of the sixth form dormitories are built above these classrooms. The new sixth form block was completed in 2008 and is located between the Science Block (opened in 1993 which contains the Art Department, D.T workshops, Science laboratories and the main I.T suite) and the courtyard classrooms.

In September 2012 the Marriott Music Centre was opened.  Named after former Chairman of Governors this was designed by Bath-based architects DKA and built by Steele Davis between April and August 2012.  It contains three learning spaces: The Technology Room, named The Friends’ Room in appreciation of a substantial donation by The Friends of Westonbirt. The Greenwood Scott Studio and the Ensemble Room, known as the Harborne Room, again in recognition of a substantial donation.  This new centre complements the Camelia Building, a small practice area for music pupils, originally a greenhouse.
The main school building is centred on the reception and the great hall, which has a marble fireplace and large organ overlooked by a balcony. 
In 2005 a new sports hall was opened by the Prince of Wales and Duchess of Cornwall. It features 25m swimming pool, courts and a gym, which is open to members of the public.

The grounds include a lake, amphitheatre, grotto, fountains and a set of Italianate gardens. The school also owns a peacock that lives in the grounds. Many of the fields around the school are rented out to farmers for cattle grazing or are used to keep horses either belonging to the local stables or to the pupils themselves. The school now owns the church, St. Catherine's, which is located within the grounds and which was originally the local parish church; Westonbirt pupils attend the church regularly.

The school library, made up of a separate ante-library and larger non-fiction library, was recently renovated using funding from an anonymous donor.

The school has a large conservatory known as the Orangery which includes a stage and balcony used for school ceremonies and drama productions. A basement contains the costume wardrobe where dramatic costumes and props are kept, originally the house's bomb shelter during World War II.

See also

Westonbirt Arboretum

Notable former pupils

 Maxine Audley, actress
 Georgia Byng, children's author
 Pamela Carruthers (1916–2009), showjumping course designer 
 Betty Clay (née Baden-Powell), scout and guides leader
 Lady Emily Compton, fashion model, stylist, and magazine editor
 Sheila Denning, painter.
 Angela Flowers, art gallerist.
 Baroness Garden, politician & Deputy Speaker of the House of Lords
 Anne Grosvenor, Duchess of Westminster (née Sullivan), race-horse owner, in particular the steeplechaser Arkle.
 Anna Hornby, artist
 June Jacobs, peace activist and campaigner for Soviet Jews.
 Diana Lamplugh, Charity founder and campaigner (1936-2011)
 Sylvia Landsberg, historian and garden designer.
 Patricia Llewellyn, television producer, businesswoman
 Aileen McCorkell, the founder and first President of the British Red Cross branch in Derry.
 Mercia MacDermott, historian, writer
 Natasha Rufus-Isaacs, socialite, co-founder of Beulah London
 Honor Salmon (née Pitman) (1912-1943), Air Transport Auxiliary Pilot
 (Susan) Pamela Rose (née Gibson), Bletchley Park translator, actress, teacher & NSPCC vice-president. Sister of Lord Gibson, married to Jim Rose.
 Jane Sinclair, priest.
 Salma Sobhan, Bangladeshi barrister, human rights activist
 Patsy Toh, Chinese pianist
 Pamela, Lady Vestey (née Armstrong), granddaughter of Dame Nellie Melba, mother of Samuel, Lord Vestey
 Ruth Watson, hotelier, food critic, broadcaster
 Julia Quinn, romance author of Bridgerton series

References

External links

Profile on the ISC website
Westonbirt School Foundation

Girls' schools in Gloucestershire
Private schools in Gloucestershire
Educational institutions established in 1928
1928 establishments in England
Boarding schools in Gloucestershire
Member schools of the Girls' Schools Association